The 2021 Stuttgart Surge season was the first season of Stuttgart Surge in the inaugural season of the European League of Football.

Regular season

Standings

With only two wins in ten games, the Surge finished with the worst record in the league. After their week 4 win against Berlin, they entered a six game losing streak, the longest of any team in the inaugural ELF season.

Schedule

Source: europeanleague.football

Transactions
On June 29, starting QB Jacob Wright was released, following allegations that the player used a racial slur in the previous game. A few days later, Stuttgart signed American QB Aaron Ellis, most recently from Danish team Sollerod Gold Diggers.

Roster

Notes

References 

Stuttgart Surge season
Stuttgart Surge
Stuttgart Surge